Puya cardonae is a species in the genus Puya. This species is endemic to Venezuela.

References

cardonae
Flora of Venezuela